KPOF (910 kHz) is a non-profit AM radio station in Denver, Colorado.  It is owned by Pillar of Fire and airs a Christian talk and teaching radio format. The studio and transmitter are in Westminster, located on the campus of Belleview Christian Schools in the historic Westminster Castle, just northwest of Denver.  KPOF uses the moniker "AM91: The Point of Faith," and is a member of the National Religious Broadcasters, noted for non-profit religious and educational programs and music.  KPOF considers itself the "granddaddy" of religious broadcasters, owned by a Christian organization since 1928.

Programming
KPOF carries local and national religious leaders, including David Jeremiah, Chuck Swindoll, Joni Eareckson Tada and John Daly.  Late nights and some weekend hours, the station broadcasts adult Christian music.

History
On January 12, 1927, KGEY was licensed and went on the air with only 15 watts of power on 1490 kilocycles. The station was privately owned but was primarily used to promote the small college where the station was based. By the next year, a new transmitter had been installed and sold to the current owners, Pillar of Fire. On March 9, 1928 the Federal Radio Commission authorized the sale and change of call sign to KPOF. In those early days of broadcasting, most of the programs were produced live with the musical talent and speakers on location.

In the 1930s, KPOF moved to 880 kilocycles, at 500 watts, as a shared time radio station.  In the early 1940s, it moved to its current dial position at 910 kHz, broadcasting at 1,000 watts.  But it still had to share the frequency with a station in Greeley, KFKA, with each station agreeing to broadcast only at certain times of the day.  A few years later, KFKA moved to AM 1310, where it remains today.  That allowed KPOF to broadcast full time on 910 kHz.

KPOF is the ninth oldest continuously licensed broadcast station in Colorado and the first in the state to broadcast in HD Radio. It is the oldest station in the Pillar of Fire Church Network, headquartered in Zarephath, New Jersey, which is the oldest chain of Christian radio stations in the world.  KPOF and the Pillar of Fire were established by Bishop Alma Bridwell White.

See also
List of radio stations in Colorado
WAWZ in Zarephath, New Jersey
WAKW in Cincinnati, Ohio

References

External links
KPOF AM91 official website

Pillar of Fire International
POF
Westminster, Colorado
POF
Christianity in Denver
Moody Radio affiliate stations
Radio stations established in 1927